Stirton's deer mouse (Peromyscus stirtoni) is a species of rodent in the family Cricetidae. It is found in El Salvador, Guatemala, Honduras, and Nicaragua. P. stirtoni is widely distributed and is presumed to have a large population and a tolerance of habitat destruction, though its biology is poorly understood. The species is named after Ruben A. Stirton (1901-1966), an American zoologist associated with the University of California at Berkeley.

References

Peromyscus
Rodents of Central America
Mammals described in 1928
Taxonomy articles created by Polbot